Stribog is a god in Slavic mythology found in three East Slavic sources, whose cult may also have existed in Poland. The sources do not inform about the functions of the god, but nowadays he is most often interpreted as a wind deity who distributes wealth.

Sources 
Stribog appears for the first time in the 12th-century Primary Chronicle together with other gods for whom Vladimir the Great erected statues:

In The Tale of Igor's Campaign, the winds are called Stribog's grandsons:

The word of John Chrysostom also mentions Stribog:

Legacy 

After Christianization, the name was preserved in toponymy: Стрибожь, Stribozh in Novgorod Governorate, Стрибоже, Strybozhe leak, Стрибожская, Strybozhskaya river in Kiev Voivodeship, Стрибож, Strybozh village in Zhytomyr Oblast, in Poland Strzyboga village and the Striboc (= Stribog) stream near Tczew, attested in the 1282, and possibly Latin name for river from modern-day Germany Striboz (1122).

 Etymologies and interpretations 

 Modern etymologies 

 Wind interpretation 
According to Roman Jakobson, Stribog contains the stem stri-, derived from the Proto-Slavic verb *sterti "to extend, spread, widen, scatter" attested only with suffixes, e.g. Polish rozpostrzeć, Russian простереть, prosteret''', or Old Czech (nepokoj) strieti. The verb comes from the Proto-Indo-European root *ster-, which in Latin occurs in the verb sterno and in the Greek verb στόρνυμι, stórnymi "to spread". The theonym would thus consist of the stem stri- and the word bog "god". On this basis, he considers Stribog to be "disperser, apportioner of riches", a complementary god to Dazhbog, "giver of riches". Proof of Stribog's association with wind is to be found in his Hindu counterpart, the wind god Vayu, who says in the Avesta "I am called he who spreads". He links the pair of Dazhbog and Stribog with the Vedic pair of Bhaga and Amça, or the Greek pair of Aisa and Poros. This etymology is one of the most popular.

According to Michał Łuczyński, Jakobson's etymology is linguistically correct, however, according to him, the division of the theonym into stri- and -bog is unlikely, since hydronyms and personal names indicate that the consonant ⟨b⟩ belonged to the root, not the suffix, e.g., the Ukrainian hydronym Стриб, Stryb, or Polish names beginning with Strzyb-: *Strzybala, Strzybalska, Strzybna, Strzybny.

Stanisław Urbańczyk, following Lubor Niederle and Alexander Afanasyev, linked the theonym with the Czech dialectal (Moravian) stři "strong wind, air", and explained the theonym as "god of creaking, swishing".

Jakobson's etymology was supported by Aleksander Gieysztor. In his search for manifestations of the cult of wind in the Slavs, he pointed to the Bulgarian wind тъмичарин, tŭmicharin, which brings darkness and blinds, and in Serbia the southern wind is called "one-eyed" (чоравац, čoravac), which may be an echo of some ancient mythological motif, to which perhaps is related the one-eyed Odin, who, like Stribog, is placed in the first group of Dumézil's tripartite, and who is sometimes interpreted as the god of wind, breath.

 Water interpretation 
Omelyan Ohonóvsʹkyy and Aleksander Brückner rejected the wind etymology as unwarranted. Instead, they related the theonym to the Ukrainian verb стриба́ти, strybaty "to jump" and explained it as "god-jumper, god who jumps". Brückner divided the word in terms of its structure into the segment strib-, and the suffix -og, in the likeness of Svarog (svar- + -og). He pointed to a whole family of words with the strib- segment connected with jumping: стриб, stryb "jump", стриба́ти, strybaty "to jump", стрибо́к, strybok "jump", стрибну́ти, strybnuty "to jump", etc. He further indicated that he could not say anything more about the theonym.

Michał Łuczyński returns to such an etymology. He points out that the Ukrainian word about such a meaning is also found in some south-western dialects of Russian. In addition, he points out that while researching the etymology of this theonym, certain words were overlooked: Russian стрыбый, strybyy "rapid, swift ("fast-dripping")", Russian dial. стрива́ть, stribat' "to flash (of lightning)", and Ukrainian стрибати, strybaty in the meaning "to escape, fly", "to jump high and far". He reconstructs the Proto-Slavic form of these words as *strybati from the Proto-Slavic stem *strū-. According to him, "to jump", "to leap" as the meaning of this word family in Ukrainian and some Russian dialects developed late, and the original meaning of these words would be "to move at high speed", and "to flow". He points to the Baltic equivalent of the meaning of Russian strybyy "rapid, swift", Lithuanian sraujùs "rapid", Latvian stràujš "fast, quick, rapid", which may indicate the probable existence of Russian stryb- "current (water)", cf. Lithuanian sraujà, Latvian strauja "current (water)". Additionally, Russian dial. stribat "to flash (of lightning)" bears a close semantic resemblance to Serbo-Croatian strujiti "to flow (of electricity)", and quotes other linguists, according to whom Serbo-Croatian strujiti can refer to water as well as air, and figuratively also to electricity.

He reconstructs the Proto-Slavic form of the theonym as *Strybogъ, which would consist of the segment *strybъ (a verb noun from *strybati "to move quickly" from "to flow, run"), and the suffix -ogъ, which had no function. The segment itself would continue the Proto-Slavic stem *stry- "to flow, run", from the Proto-Balto-Slavic *srū-, from the Proto-Indo-European *srew- "to flow". This etymology is supported by the fact that after Christianization this theonym was preserved mainly in hydronyms, which proves that the meaning of the theonym was known to the Slavs.

The Old East Slavic notation of the theonym (Стрибогъ, Stribogǔ) with the vowel ⟨i⟩ instead of the expected ⟨y⟩ is explained as a mixing of these vowels, which is attested in the texts of southern East Slavic since the end of the 11th century, which is connected with the influence of the grammar of the Old Church Slavonic/Bulgarian language on the Old East Slavic language. The mixing of these vowels also occurs in hydronyms (*Stir-/*Styr) and in Ukrainian, cf. Стрый/Стрий, Stryj/Strij, Стрына/Стрина, Stryna/Strina.

 Dated and other etymologies 
According to Mark Vey, Stribog could in fact be originally an epithet meaning literally "father god", which was used in the religions of Indo-Europeans to describe the god of the bright sky. The reconstructed Proto-Indo-European term for "god father" is *Dyḗus ph₂tḗr (cp. Roman Jupiter (Iūpiter, Diespiter), Greek Zeus (Zeus Pater) and Vedic Dyaus (Dyáuṣ-pitṛ́); sometimes in reverse order) and its local variety *ph₂tḗr bhagos. After the so-called Iranian inversion, Slavic peoples abandoned the word *dyḗus and replaced it with the word bog, which is borrowed from Iranian languages (from the PIE. *bhagos) and which appears as a second part of the name. Proto-Indo-Europan *ph₂tḗr ("father") is generally also considered to be absent in the Slavic languages (replaced by the synonym *átta → otec) or even in the Balto-Slavic languages,  but according to Vey, *ph₂tḗr turned into the Slavic word *stryjь, which now means "uncle, father's brother" as follows: *ph₂tḗr → *ptri- → stri- and is the first part of the name. Stribog could therefore be the Slavic god of sky. This etymology has been advocated by a number of scholars, including Vyacheslav Ivanov and Vladimir Toporov who placed Stribog in the first group of the so-called the trifunctional hypothesis of Dumézil, which groups the main deities who look after the community and watch over the distribution of goods.

Such etymology is criticized by most linguists. The word *stryjь is derived from PIE *stru-io- and is cognate to Lithuanian strùjus "uncle, old man", Old Irish sruith "old, venerable" and Old Welsh strutiu "old man", and the process described by Vey did not occur in Slavic language. Brückner in his Dictionary noted that the word stryj was sometimes referred to as "good wind" and connected it to the core stru- "to flow" (cf. Stryj in Ukraine).

There are also other interpretations of the name: Zelenin connected the stri- root with the word стрити, stryty (Proto-Slavic *sъtьri) "to annihilate, destroy," and considered Stribog to be "annihilating, destroying god," the god of war. This view was supported by Orlov and Borovsky, this may also be indicated by the fact that Vayu is also worshipped as the god of war, of the dead, of the harvest, but also of the good and bad fate, as he connects sky and earth. The name was also associated with the nickname of Ahura Mazda Śribaya/Stribaya ("god of beauty", "god worthy of honor", cf. Sanskrit श्री, śri "beauty"), which is supposed to be an Iranian influence and ultimately come from *ph₂tḗr bhagos, but this etymology is problematic. Pisani reconstructed the name as *strigo-bogъ, in which *strigo- would correspond to the Latin frigus ("frost, cold") and in that case Stribog would be the god of cold.

 Influences 
 HD 75898 − star named after Stribog
 Stribog Mountains on the Brabant Island, Antarctica
 Ivana Brlić-Mažuranić: Šuma Striborova ("Stribor's forest") – a tale, part of her collection of tales titled Croatian Tales of Long Ago''.
 Grand Power Stribog − firearm by the Slovak firm Grand Power s.r.o named for the deity Stribog
 Striborg - Australian black metal musician named after the deity.

References 
 Notes

 References

Bibliography 
 
 
 
 
 
 
 
 
 
 
 
 
 
 
 
 
 
 

Slavic gods
Wind gods
Water gods